Norm Beechey is a retired Australian race car driver, who was given the nickname "Stormin Norman" by his fans. To some, he was the closest thing Holden had to a star racing driver, before Peter Brock. Beechey competed in the Australian Touring Car Championship from 1963 to 1972 winning the title in 1965 driving a Ford Mustang and in 1970 at the wheel of a Holden Monaro.  Along the way, he achieved seven round wins, and one pole position. His championship win in 1970 was the first victory by a Holden driver in the Australian Touring Car Championship.

Career
Beechey began racing at the age of 22 in a Ford Customline V8. He came to prominence only a year later when he won the Olympic Touring Car Race at Albert Park, a support event at the Australian Grand Prix meeting which was held in conjunction with the 1956 Melbourne Olympic Games. As the expense of running this and two subsequent Customline V8s proved too prohibitive he reverted to a Holden 48-215 in 1959. After becoming part of David McKay’s Scuderia Veloce team he again returned to V8s, developing a Chevrolet Impala with which he won the New South Wales Touring Car Championship at Catalina Park. He progressed to a Ford Galaxie owned by Len Lukey and was then instrumental in forming the Neptune Racing Team in 1964. He raced a Holden EH S4 as part of that team alongside Jim McKeown’s Lotus Cortina and Peter Manton’s Morris Cooper S. He subsequently developed and raced a series of V8 powered Touring Cars with which he contested the Australian Touring Car Championship and other events. The first Ford Mustang to race in Australia was followed by a Chevrolet Chevy II Nova, a Chevrolet Camaro, a Holden Monaro GTS 327 and a Holden Monaro GTS 350.

Beechey retired from racing at the end of the 1972 season. He was inducted into the V8 Supercars Hall of Fame in 2000.

Career results

Complete Australian Touring Car Championship results
(key) (Races in bold indicate pole position) (Races in italics indicate fastest lap)

Complete Phillip Island/Bathurst 500 results

References

External links
 Norm Beechey racing images; retrieved 12 September 2008
 1970 ATCC film clips featuring Norm Beechey; retrieved 12 September 2008.

Australian racing drivers
Australian Touring Car Championship drivers
Living people
1930s births
Date of birth missing (living people)
Place of birth missing (living people)